Millstreet is a town in north County Cork, Ireland, with a population of 1,555 (as of 2016).

Millstreet is within the civil parish of Drishane, and within a Poor Law Union also called Millstreet. The Millstreet Union encompasses the civil parishes of Drishane and Kilcorney.

Geography
The town is at the foot of Clara Mountain.

The townlands within Millstreet Poor Law Union were part of the barony of West Muskerry. Aubane was a neighbourhood of Millstreet Poor Law Union within the townlands of Tooreenbane and Tullig, and is outside the town itself.

Culture
The Green Glens Arena, an entertainment complex and large equestrian centre, is located in Millstreet. It has hosted a number of major events, including the Eurovision Song Contest 1993, with Millstreet being the smallest town to host the competition. After the 2022 Russian invasion of Ukraine, the arena was agreed to be used for temporary accommodation for Ukrainian refugees.

Since 1961, Millstreet Town Park has been used for a 'Christmas meeting' of a local coursing club. In 2021, the controversial practice of live hare coursing was subject to protest by local residents.

Since 1985, the town has been twinned with Pommerit-le-Vicomte in Brittany, France.

Amenities
The town's Roman Catholic church was built in 1833 and is dedicated to Saint Patrick.

The town is on the Mallow–Killarney–Tralee line of the Irish railway network. Millstreet railway station, which opened in 1853 and closed for some goods traffic in 1976, was refurbished in 1993 and remains open for passenger train services.

People
 Mark Ellis, inter-county hurler
 Joanne O'Riordan, activist, journalist and People of the Year Award winner
Timothy Carroll, Roman Catholic Bishop

References

External links

 Millstreet Town Website
 Aubane Historical Society

 
Towns and villages in County Cork